The Serpent and the Rainbow: A Harvard Scientist's Astonishing Journey into the Secret Societies of Haitian Voodoo, Zombies, and Magic is a 1985 book by anthropologist and researcher Wade Davis.  He investigated Haitian Vodou and the process of making zombies.  He studied ethnobotanical poisons, discovering their use in a reported case of a contemporary zombie, Clairvius Narcisse.

Overview
The book presents the case of Clairvius Narcisse, a man who had been a zombie for two years, arguing that the zombification process was more likely the result of a complex interaction of tetrodotoxin, a powerful hallucinogenic plant called Datura, and cultural forces and beliefs.

According to the book, the assortment of ingredients in Haitian zombie powder include puffer fish, matter from a corpse (specifically to Davis' adventure in Haiti, the bokor, a Haitian shaman, crushed the skull of a deceased infant that had been dead for a month or two, and added it to the poison), freshly killed blue lizards, a large dried toad (Bufo marinus) with a dried sea worm wrapped around it (prepared beforehand), "tcha-tcha" (Albizzia), and "itching pea" (pois grater, a species of Mucuna).

The book inspired the 1988 horror film, The Serpent and the Rainbow.

Criticism 

Davis' claims were criticized for a number of scientific inaccuracies. Some scientists found little or no tetrodotoxin in samples provided by Davis, with some accusing him of fraud.  Davis argued that a number of factors may account for the negative results of some investigators and decried their unsubstantiated accusations of fraud, noting the variability of formulations, possible errors in the testing performed on the samples he brought back, the possibility that the tetrodotoxin-based mixture may have had ingredients that improved blood–brain barrier transmission of the tetrodotoxin, and the nature of folk medicine with respect to success rates (i.e., that very few successes are required to establish credibility).

In the book, Davis does not suggest that the zombie powder containing tetrodotoxin was used for maintaining "mental slaves", but for producing the initial death and resurrection that convinced the victims and those who knew them that they had become zombies. The zombies, such as Clairvius Narcisse, were kept biddable by regular doses of the poisonous plant, Datura stramonium, which produces amnesia, delirium, and suggestibility.

References

1985 non-fiction books
American non-fiction books
Books about Haiti
Non-fiction books adapted into films
Books by Wade Davis
English-language books
Simon & Schuster books
Voodoo texts
Zombies